Thomas Heaton may refer to:

 Tom Heaton (born 1986), English football goalkeeper
 Thomas H. Heaton (born 1951), American seismologist
 Thomas Heaton (footballer, born 1897), English footballer